Shirley Setia is a New Zealand singer and actress known for her work in the Indian film and music industries. Born in Daman, India in the former union territory of Daman and Diu, she immigrated with her family to Auckland and came to attention as a YouTube musician uploading covers of Bollywood songs while still a student at the University of Auckland. Setia subsequently featured in the Forbes magazine, where she was referred to as "Bollywood's Next Big Singing Sensation".

Setia made her acting debut with 2020 Hindi film Maska which released on Netflix. She made her big screen debut with Nikamma in 2022 and also starred in the Telugu film Krishna Vrinda Vihari, which released on 23 September 2022.

Early life
Setia was born in Daman, India and raised in Auckland, New Zealand. A graduate student from the University of Auckland and marketing and publicity intern at Auckland Council, Setia took part in a contest conducted by T-Series. Her YouTube entry was recorded in her bedroom while she was wearing pyjamas, which earned her the nickname "Pyjama popstar" by the New Zealand Herald. Setia was eventually declared the winner.

Career

Singing career
After working in a weekly radio show and taking part in local competitions in Auckland, Setia performed in her first concerts in Mumbai and Hyderabad in India in 2016. Forbes magazine's Rob Cain wrote a feature on her and her future goals, in which he stated that "Bollywood's Next Big Singing Sensation Just Might Be This Tiny Kiwi". she was also acknowledged as India's YouTube sensation by the Hindustan Times and as one of New Zealand's biggest international artists by TVNZ.

, she has 3.71 million subscribers on YouTube with 308 million views. She was invited by YouTube as a 'YouTube Creator' to perform live in YouTube FanFest held in Mumbai in 2016 and 2017.

Acting career
Setia made her acting debut with 2020 film Maska which released on Netflix. Her next film was Nikamma released in June 2022, a remake of 2017 Telugu film Middle Class Abbayi. She made her Telugu film debut with Krishna Vrinda Vihari which released in September 2022.

Discography

Filmography

Films

Web series

References

External links 

 

1995 births
Living people
People from Daman district, India
Indian emigrants to New Zealand
Musicians from Auckland
New Zealand people of Indian descent
New Zealand YouTubers
New Zealand women pop singers
New Zealand film actresses
New Zealand web series actresses
University of Auckland alumni
Filmi singers
Actresses of Indian descent
Expatriate musicians in India
New Zealand expatriate actresses in India
Actresses in Hindi cinema
Actresses in Telugu cinema
21st-century New Zealand actresses
21st-century New Zealand women singers
Music YouTubers